is a city located in southern Gifu Prefecture in Japan. , the city had an estimated population of 148,225, and a population density of 1700 persons per km2, in 59,736 households.

Situated in the northern part of the Nōbi Plain, what is now Kakamigahara originally thrived as a post station on the Nakasendō highway connecting Edo with Kyoto, being called "Unuma-juku" at the time.  In more recent history, the city developed due to the JASDF Gifu base.  In addition, Kakamigahara grew as an industrial city and a commuter suburb of Gifu City and Nagoya.

The city of Kakamigahara has many large parks, the most notable among them being "Kakamigahara Kōen", which was originally made from a vacant lot owned by Gifu University.  A city planning policy of making Kakamigahara into a "park city" has been undertaken by the municipality, and in 2005, the city received the Green City Prize from the prime minister.

Although the city was officially named Kakamigahara, it is also called Kakamihara, Kagamihara, or Kagamigahara by tradition.

Geography

Mountainous terrain runs from the northern to the eastern part of the city.  The Kiso River flows through the southern part, forming the municipal and prefectural (Aichi-Gifu) border.  A large portion of the city is situated on the Kakamigahara Plateau.  Because the soil is very well drained, it was not traditionally suited to rice cultivation.  With the exception of rest stops such as Unuma-juku or other roadside settlements, though, the area was largely wilderness until the Meiji period. The names of the Meitetsu train stations, Rokken, Nijukken, and the Ogase Reservoir are from that era.  Beginning from the Meiji period, to take advantage of the large amount of wilderness and well-drained soil, military bases and training grounds were established.  In addition, Gifu University's agricultural and engineering departments were established in the area, leading the growth of machine and textile factories.  These industries, in addition to carrot production, which used the dry soil, became the main industries of the town. Part of the city is within the borders of the Hida-Kisogawa Quasi-National Park.

Mountains
Mt.Gongen,
Mt.Igi, 
Mt.Mii,
Mt.Kakami,
Kakamigahara Alps

Rivers
Kiso, Sakai, Shin-Sakai, Daianji

Lakes
Ogase Reservoir

Adjacent cities and districts
North: Seki

East: Kamo District (Sakahogi-cho)

West: Gifu City, Hashima District (Kasamatsu-cho, Ginan-cho)

South: Ichinomiya, Konan, Inuyama, Niwa District ( Fusou-cho)

Climate
The city has a climate characterized by hot and humid summers, and mild winters (Köppen climate classification Cfa).  The average annual temperature in Kakamigahara is 15.5 °C. The average annual rainfall is 1939 mm, with September as the wettest month. The temperatures are highest on average in August, at around 27.9 °C, and lowest in January, at around 3.9 °C.

History
The area around Kakamigahara was part of traditional Mino Province.  During the post-Meiji restoration cadastral reforms, the area was organised into Inaba District, Gifu in April 1897.

1 April 1963:  Kakamigahara City was founded by amalgamating Naka, Sohara, Unuma, and Inaba.

1968: The Line Bridge was completed.  Together with the Inuyama bridge, completed in 1925, these two bridges span the Kiso River and connect Kakamigahara City with Aichi Prefecture.

1969: The Aigi bridge was completed.  This was the third bridge to span the Kiso, and connects the city to Aichi Prefecture.  It was the first bridge to connect Kakamigahara to Konan City.

5 March 1986:  The section of the Tokai-Hokoriku Expressway between Kakamigahara Junction and Mino Junction was opened.  Furthermore, on 13 December 1998, the Tokai-Hokoriku Expressway was connected to the Meishin Expressway (Ichinomiya Junction).

28 March 2000: The twinning of the Inuyama Bridge was completed.  Previously, Meitetsu trains had shared the bridge with automobiles, crossing the bridge in a manner similar to streetcars.  After the twinning, the trains began to use the old Inuyama Bridge.  This separation of trains and automobiles improved transportation across the river.

1 November 2004: Kawashima-cho (Hashima District), was incorporated in Kakamigahara City.

5 November 2006: The Shin-mei Ko-ami Bridge, connecting to Konan, is completed.

24 March 2013: Kakamigahara Bridge is completed.  It connects the city hall area with Kawashima-chiku (formerly Kawashima-cho) of Konan City.  With the completion of this bridge, there are now four routes from Kakamigahara City into Aichi Prefecture.

Demographics
Per Japanese census data, the population of Kakamigahara has recently plateaued after a long period of growth.

As of December 2013, about 3,000 residents of foreign nationality were registered in Kakamigahara City.  The largest numbers are, in descending order, from Brazil, China, and the Philippines.

Government

Politics
Kakamigahara has a mayor-council form of government with a directly elected mayor and a unicameral city legislature of 24 members.

Current mayor: Kenji Asano (inaugurated 20 May 2013, first term)
Previous mayors:
Kaichi Mutou - 1963–1968, resigned during second term due to illness
Keikichi Matsubara - 1968–1973, resigned during second term due to corruption scandal
Kihachirou Hirano - 1973–1997, served six terms
Shin Mori - 1997-2013, served four terms

Economy
Kakamigahara City is second in Gifu Prefecture in terms of industrial production.  The city has an aircraft factory operated by Kawasaki Heavy Industries Aerospace Company, located next to the JASDF Gifu Air Base, and Mitsubishi Heavy Industries also produces aircraft parts. The city also has many automobile-related factories, including parts makers and metalworking industries.  In Sue-cho in the north of Kakamigahara City, an industrial park called Techno Plaza was established by the Gifu Prefectural government as a focal point for the research and development of robotics and virtual reality.  With Waseda University's WABOT-HOUSE laboratory and Gifu University's Science and Technology Promotion Center as a nucleus, Techno Plaza is structured as an industrial and R&D center.  Many ventures have moved into the park, including some companies that have made IPOs, such as Nippon Ichi Software, Inc.

Major employers
Kawasaki Heavy Industries Aerospace Company
Calbee (Kakamigahara factory): This factory produces Kakamigahara kimchi-flavored potato chips, which are exclusive to this region.
Nippon Ichi Software
Gifu Auto Body Industries
Nakanihon Diecast Co.
Tenryu Industries Co.
Eisai Co.
Taikou Seikou Co.
Zero Sports (Zero Max)

Educational institutions

Universities and colleges
Tokai Gakuin University
Chubu Gakuin University

High schools
The city has three public high schools operated by the Gifu Prefectural Board of Education.
Gifu Prefectural Kakamihara Senior High School (岐阜県立各務原高等学校   -  岐阜県立各務原高等学校) (academic)
Gifu Prefectural Kakamigahara Nishi Senior High School (岐阜県立各務原西高等学校 - 岐阜県立各務原西高等学校) (academic)
Gifu Prefectural Gifu-Kakamino High School (岐阜県立岐阜各務野高等学校 - 岐阜県立岐阜各務野高等学校) (technical)

Primary and secondary schools
Kakimigahara has 16 public elementary schools and eight public junior high schools operated by the city government. The city also operates one special-education school.

International schools
 Centro Educacional Nova Etapa - CENE (セントロ・エドカショナル・ノヴァ・エターパ - セントロ・エドカショナル・ノヴァ・エターパ) - Brazilian school

Transportation

Railways
  Central Japan Railway Company - Takayama Main Line
 -  -  - 
  Meitetsu - Meitetsu Kakamigahara Line
  -  - -  -  - -  -  -  -  - 
  Meitetsu - Meitetsu Inuyama Line

Highways
Tōkai-Hokuriku Expressway Gifu-Kakamigahara IC

Bridges
Aigi Ohashi Bridge crosses the Kiso River into Inuyama in Aichi Prefecture.

Other
JASDF Gifu Air Base was established as an army airfield in 1917, and is currently used by the JSDF for aircraft and flight testing. From 1945 to 1958, it was occupied by the U.S. military and known as "Camp Gifu".

Local attractions

Kakamigahara Air and Space Museum - Kakamigahara Aerospace Science Museum features a number of indoor and outdoor exhibits, including aircraft and displays covering the history of aircraft development and Gifu prefecture's role in it.
ÆON Kakamigahara Shopping Center opened in July 2007, ÆON, and houses 186 specialty shops and a JUSCO department store. The center includes a 10-screen multiplex cinema and a parking lot for about 4,000 cars.
Gifu World Fresh Water Aquarium - Highway Oasis

Twin towns – sister cities

Kakamigahara is twinned with:
 Chuncheon, South Korea (2003)

Friendly city
 Tsuruga, Japan (1989)

References

External links

  

 
Cities in Gifu Prefecture